Hovhannes Sargsyan (born 14 November 1987) is an Armenian cross-country skier. He competed in the men's sprint event at the 2006 Winter Olympics.

References

1987 births
Living people
Armenian male cross-country skiers
Olympic cross-country skiers of Armenia
Cross-country skiers at the 2006 Winter Olympics
Sportspeople from Gyumri
21st-century Armenian people